Athletes from Iceland first participated at the Olympic Games in 1908.

The National Olympic Committee was created in 1921 and recognized by the International Olympic Committee in 1935.
After 1936, Iceland has sent athletes to compete in every Summer Olympic Games since.
Iceland has also participated in all but one edition of the Winter Olympic Games since 1948, missing only the 1972 Winter Games.

Icelandic athletes have won a total of four medals, two in athletics, one in judo and one in handball.

Medal tables

Medals by Games

Medals by Winter Games

Medals by sport

List of medalists

See also
 List of flag bearers for Iceland at the Olympics

References

External links